Iodine is a chemical element with symbol I and atomic number 53.

Iodine may also refer to:

Isotopes of iodine:
Iodine-123
Iodine-124
Iodine-125
Iodine-129
Iodine-131
Iodine clock reaction
Iodine (medical use)
Povidone-iodine, a common antiseptic
Tincture of iodine
Lugol's iodine
Iodine deficiency
Iodine Recordings
Iodine test
Iodine value
Little Iodine, a comics character
 "Iodine", a song by Leonard Cohen from Death of a Ladies' Man
 Iodine (film), a 2009 Canadian science-fiction film
 "Iodine", a song by Icon For Hire from Scripted

See also

 I (disambiguation)
 Isotopes of iodine